Day is an unincorporated community and census-designated place in Lafayette County, Florida, United States. Its population was 89 as of the 2020 census. Day has a post office with ZIP code 32013.

Demographics

References

Unincorporated communities in Lafayette County, Florida
Census-designated places in Florida
Unincorporated communities in Florida